Max "Slats" Zaslofsky (December 7, 1925 – October 15, 1985) was an American professional basketball player and coach. He was first-team All-NBA in the league's first four seasons. In the 1947–48 BAA season, at 21 years of age, he led the BAA in scoring, and in the 1949–50 NBA season, he led the league in free throw percentage (.843).

Early life
Zaslofsky, who was Jewish, was the son of Russian immigrant parents, Morris and Ida. He had two older brothers, Irving and Abe. He grew up in Brooklyn, attended cheder until he had his bar mitzvah, and spent many hours as a child on the playgrounds trying to perfect his two-handed set shot. Raised on Riverdale Street in the predominantly Jewish section of Brownsville, he attended Thomas Jefferson High School, where he was an All-PSAL selection in basketball and also played for the baseball team. He graduated from high school in 1943, and then spent two years in the U.S. Navy during World War II.

College career
He attended St. John's University, where he played basketball for one season. The 20-year-old Zaslofsky started at guard and averaged 7.8 points per game. He was named honorable mention All-Metropolitan as St. John's posted a 17-5 record and played in the postseason National Invitation Tournament (NIT).

Professional career
After his freshman season, he left St. John's to join the Chicago Stags of the newly organized Basketball Association of America, the forerunner of the National Basketball Association.

While playing for the Chicago Stags, Zaslofsky was named All-NBA First Team 1946–47 at the age of 21. He was the youngest player to hold that distinction for nearly 60 years until he was surpassed by LeBron James in 2005–06. In 1947–48, he led the league in scoring. At 22 years, 121 days old, he was the youngest player to lead the league in scoring until 2010, when Kevin Durant broke his mark. In 1949–50, he led the league in free throw percentage (.843).

After the Stags broke up, Zaslofsky joined the New York Knicks. During the 1951 NBA Playoffs, Zaslofsky played 14 games and averaged a postseason career-best 17.9 points, as well as 4.1 rebounds and 2.7 assists, as the Knicks made it to the NBA Finals before losing a seven game series to the Rochester Royals. The following year, he led the Knicks to the 1952 NBA Finals, where they lost to the Minneapolis Lakers, again in a seven game series. On August 24, 1953, he was traded by the Knicks with Jim Luisi and Roy Belliveau to the Baltimore Bullets for Jim Baechtold. On November 25, 1953, he was traded by the Bullets to the Milwaukee Hawks for Bob Houbregs. On December 21, 1953, he was traded by the Hawks to the Fort Wayne Pistons for Chuck Share. In 1956 he ended his career as the league's third-leading scorer of all-time, behind George Mikan and Joe Fulks. In addition to his 1946–47 first-team All-NBA honors, Zaslofsky was named to the All-NBA first team in 1947–48, 1948–49, and 1949–50. He also played in the 1952 NBA All-Star Game.

He later coached for two seasons in the American Basketball Association with the New Jersey Americans/New York Nets. He went 53-103 in two seasons with the club before resigning in March 1969.

Zaslofsky was nominated for the NBA 25th Anniversary Team in 1971. He is one of only two members nominated to the team that are not elected in the Naismith Basketball Hall of Fame.

Personal life
Zaslofsky is a member of the International Jewish Sports Hall of Fame and the New York City Basketball Hall of Fame.

Zaslofsky died in 1985 at age 59 due to complications from leukemia. He was survived by his wife, Elaine, two daughters, a son, and two grandchildren.

BAA/NBA career statistics

Regular season

Playoffs

See also
List of select Jewish basketball players
List of National Basketball Association annual scoring leaders

References

External links
 BasketballReference.com: Max Zaslofsky (as coach)
 BasketballReference.com: Max Zaslofsky (as player)

1925 births
1985 deaths
20th-century American Jews
American men's basketball players
Baltimore Bullets (1944–1954) players
Basketball players from New York City
Chicago Stags players
Deaths from leukemia
Fort Wayne Pistons players
Jewish American sportspeople
Jewish men's basketball players
Milwaukee Hawks players
National Basketball Association All-Stars
New Jersey Americans head coaches
New York Knicks players
Shooting guards
Sportspeople from Brooklyn
St. John's Red Storm men's basketball players
Thomas Jefferson High School (Brooklyn) alumni